Tennis was contested at the Far Eastern Championship Games. It was one of the main eight sports to feature on the programme. The following are the known results for the tennis event of the games.

Editions

References

Tennis
Far Eastern Championship Games
Far Eastern Championship Games